Blue Star Memorial Highways are highways in the United States that are marked to pay tribute to the U.S. armed forces. The National Council of State Garden Clubs, now known as National Garden Clubs, Inc., started the program in 1945 after World War II. The blue star was used on service flags to denote a service member fighting in the war. The program has since been expanded to include Memorial Markers and Memorial By-ways (since 1994). These markers are used in National Cemeteries, parks, veterans facilities, and gardens.

List

Alabama 
Scenic Highway 98, Baldwin County starting at Montrose–Daphne city line and traveling north through Montrose
Sponsored by the Montrose Garden Club
Dedicated April 18, 2015 in a ceremony held at Knights of Columbus Hall
US 31 just north of Prattville

Alaska 

Sterling Highway, marker at Anchor Point, the westernmost point on the North American contiguous highway system.

Arkansas 
 I-30; Marker is at the Arkansas Welcome Center on East-bound I-30 just outside of Texarkansa.
There also is a marker at Arkansas State University in Jonesboro Ar,
Interstate 55 at the Arkansas Welcome Center in Blytheville AR. Mile marker 68 southbound.

California 
 SR 58 in Southern California
 SR 211, in Humboldt County; marker at Veterans Memorial Building, 1100 Main Street, Ferndale
 US 101 at Trinidad in Humboldt County; markers at both north and south bound Trinidad rest areas between miles 728 and 731
 SR 62 in Southern California from the Arizona state line to I-10
Interstate 80 at Hunter Hill Safety Rest Area in Vallejo, California
U.S. 395 at Coso Junction in Inyo County
San Fernando Blvd. (Former U.S. Route 99) in Burbank, California; marker located at McCambridge Park

Colorado 
 US 40 in Lakewood Marker at Abbie Duston Roadside Park.
US 287 in Lafayette at Baseline Road.

Delaware 
US 13 at the Smyrna Rest Area and in Seaford.

Florida 

 US 1 in Florida
 US 17 in Charlotte County, Citrus County, Clay County
 US 19 and US 27 in Perry, Florida
 US 41 in Charlotte County, Collier County, Lee County, Manatee County, Sarasota County
 US 90 in Baker County
 US 92 at the intersection with CR 579 on Kennedy Hill in front of the Hardee's Restaurant between the towns of Thonotosassa, Seffner, and Mango.
 US 98 and Gautier Road in Constitution Park, Port Saint Joe
 US 98 in Bay County
 US 441 in Alachua County
 Lakewood Ranch Town Hall in Lakewood Ranch
 Old Route 41 in Bonita Springs

Georgia 

 I-75 at the Georgia Welcome center near Ringgold. 
 I-75 at the Georgia Welcome center in Lowndes County. 
 I-75 at the Georgia Rest area in Cook County. 
 I-75 at the Georgia Rest area in Dooly County. 
 I-75 at the Georgia Rest area in Monroe County. 
 I-75 at the Georgia Rest area in Turner County. 
 I-95 at the Georgia Welcome center near Savannah.
 SR 13 (Buford Highway) between Rest Haven and Buford
 SR 13 (Buford Highway), Cornelia
 Lumpkin Street near the University of Georgia, Athens
 Covington (Hwy 36) Monticello Street SW at Church Street
 In front of the Thomas County Courthouse, Thomasville
 Along GA27/US341 in front of the Appling County Public Library, Baxley, Appling County
 Along GA37 in Fort Gaines, Clay County
 Along GA35/GA133 in Moultrie, Colquitt County
 In Riverfront Park, Albany, Dougherty County
 In Marshes of Glynn Overlook Park, off US 17, Brunswich, Glynn County
 Along US19 in roadside park, Mitchell County
 Along GA18/US41 in front of the American Legion buildings in Forsyth, Monroe County
 Along GA153 in Ellaville, Schley County
 Along GA38/US84 in front of the Screven City Hall, Screven
 Along GA3/GA30/US19 in Americus, Sumter County
 Along US1 in roadside park, Toombs County
 Along GA4/US1/US23 in Ware County
 Along US341 in Jesup, Wayne County
 In Georgia Veterans State Park, Crisp County

Illinois 
 IL 43 (South Harlem Avenue) at the intersection of Will County Route 74 (West Laraway Road) in Frankfort in 1980.
 95th Street & Cook Avenue in Oak Lawn; Across from Oak Lawn Village Library.
 Illinois Route 43 (North Harlem Avenue) at the intersection on North Avondale Avenue (approx. 6300 North)

Indiana 
 US 31 Business in Peru at the southwest Intersection with River Road.
 I-70 eastbound and westbound rest area's near Plainfield.
 US 50 in Jackson County, on the northwest area of Muscatatuck National Wildlife Refuge.

https://www.gardenclub.org/blue-and-gold-star-memorials

Iowa 
 I-29 north of Council Bluffs; marker was originally placed along US 75 in 1955.

Kansas 
Smith Center Garden Club 
National Garden Clubs 
Roadside Park

Kentucky 
 Barkley Regional Airport, 2901 Fisher Road (West Paducah); Open Gate Garden Club, Paducah.

Louisiana

Maine 

The history of Blue Star Memorial Highways in Maine, according to Maine Garden Clubs:

• 1946 — Garden Club Federation of Maine adopts program.

• 1947 — U.S. Route 1 designated as Maine's Blue Star Memorial Highway. This covered 546 miles from Fort Kent to Kittery.

• 1957 — U.S. Route 1 and U.S. 1-A, starting at the junction of Route 1A and 1 in Stockton Springs and extending via Bangor and Brewer to the junction of Route 1A and 1 in Ellsworth, are designated as Blue Star Memorial Highways.

• 1972 — U.S. Route 2, including Skowhegan, and state Route 3, are designated Blue Star Memorial Highways. This gave Maine 952 miles of Blue Star Memorial Highway.

• 1974 — State Route 157 and U.S. Route 201, from the junction of Route 1 at Brunswick to the Canadian border near Jackman, is designated a Blue Star Memorial Highway, giving Maine a total of 1171.6 miles of designated highway.

• 1981 — The new entrance to Maine Veterans Memorial Cemetery in Augusta is designated a Blue Star Memorial Highway.

Maryland 
 U.S. Route 301 in all of Maryland

Massachusetts 
 Interstate 495 and State Route 25, extending from I-95 close to the New Hampshire state line in Salisbury to Cape Cod. I-495 (Salisbury to Wareham portion) is the second-longest auxiliary Interstate Highway in the U.S.

Michigan 
 U.S. Route 31
Woodward Avenue, marker on northbound side, just south of I-696 in Pleasant Ridge
U.S. 31/Blue Star Highway (County Road A2), north of Phoenix Road/Blue Star Highway traffic light in South Haven

Minnesota 

 Interstate 35 throughout the state.
 Interstate 94 throughout the state.

Nebraska 
 U.S. Route 83 Kansas border to South Dakota border

New Hampshire 
Interstate 95 throughout the state. There is a marker at the rest area in Seabrook just beyond the state line.

New Jersey 
 U.S. Route 22 from Mountainside to North Plainfield
 County Route 632/Ridgedale Avenue from East Hanover, Morris County.
 North side of NJ 70 (John Davison Rockefeller Highway), just west of Chairville Road, Medford Township 08055

New York 
 Niagara Section of the New York State Thruway, Interstate 190, adjacent to the toll plaza for the northbound South Grand Island Bridge
 New Rochelle at intersection of Main Street and Pratt Street. Fanneuil Park across the street from the New Rochelle Armory.
 Brewster at the historic Brewster Metro-North station clock on the triangle at US 6 (Main Street) and Railroad Avenue.
 Rockland County, New York, Thruway Extension Section of the New York State Thruway to the Garden State Parkway at Chestnut Ridge, Installed and dedicated on October 22, 1958. The marker is currently missing (2018).
 Broome County, New York, the Southern Tier Welcome Center in Kirkwood along Interstate 81. Sponsored by National Garden Clubs Inc.

North Carolina 

 Interstate 26, throughout state (approved on October 4, 1968).
 Milepost 41 – Westbound Buncombe/Henderson County Rest Area (dedicated on July 18, 2008).
 Milepost 68 – Westbound Welcome Center.
 Interstate 40, throughout state (approved on May 5, 1967).
 Milepost 82 – Westbound McDowell County Rest Area.
 Milepost 136 – Eastbound Catawba County Rest Area.
 Milepost 364 – Duplin County Rest Area (dedicated on April 6, 2005).
 Interstate 77, throughout state.
 Milepost 105 – Southbound Welcome Center (dedicated on July 21, 2006).
 Interstate 85, throughout state (approved on May 5, 1967).
 Interstate 95, throughout state (approved on June 13, 1980).
 Milepost 181 – Southbound Welcome Center.
 U.S. Route 17, from Wilmington to Elizabeth City (approved on November 28, 1949).
 U.S. Route 64, from Tennessee state line to Nags head (approved in July 2017).
 U.S. Route 70, throughout state.
 15th Avenue Place SE, in Hickory.
 U.S. Route 74 Business from Rockingham to Hamlet (approved on April 20, 1984).
 New Hamlet Senior Center, in Hamlet (dedicated on October 18, 1984).
 U.S. Route 158, from Mocksville to Roanoke Rapids (approved on April 6, 1976).
 U.S. Route 158, from Roanoke Rapids to Elizabeth City (approved on May 4, 1972).
 U.S. Route 158, from Elizabeth City to Nags Head (approved on November 28, 1949).
 U.S. Route 301, throughout state (approved on April 28, 1949).
 Hay Street at Freedom Memorial Park, in Fayetteville (dedicated on March 3, 1956).
 U.S. Route 421, in Wilkes County.
 Milepost 282 – Northwest Visitor Center (dedicated on September 14, 2010).
 North Carolina Highway 24, in Jacksonville (approved on April 20, 1984).
 Near City Hall towards Camp Lejeune, in Jacksonville (dedicated on May 27, 1984).

Oklahoma 
 Blue Star Memorial By-Way, dedicated by the Dogwood Garden Club of Red Fork, Oklahoma to recognize military personnel for their service to the United States of America and the many service men and women have passed through Tulsa during their time in defending the country.  Location: Route 66 Historical Village, 3770 Southwest Blvd, Tulsa, Oklahoma

Oregon

 Blue Star Memorial Rose Garden, Veterans Administration Healthcare System, Roseburg, Oregon. Location: Interstate 5, Garden Valley Blvd exit, west on Garden Valley. left(South) on Centennial Dr.-VA Roseburg entrance. Blue Star Memorial is located on the corner of Centennial Dr & NW Veterans Way.  
 Washburne Wayside, Highway 99W, north of Junction City. Blue This marker is no longer here.  The State sold the land and the marker was removed.
Corvallis, Oregon on 99N, to the left of the entrance ramp on to road leading to I5
Santiam Pass, Oregon Hwy 20 at Tombstone Wayside.
Albany, Oregon, Waverly Park, Albany (28) Located right off I-5 and the entrance to Albany, Dedicated June 1, 1991.
Alsea, Oregon, Alsea Memorial Garden (29) BWM Located in Alsea, close to OR Hwy 34, Dedicated June 21, 1991.
Albany, Oregon, Linn County Veterans Memorial (63) Located in Albany's Timber Linn Park, off I-5, Dedicated May 17, 2008.
Lebanon, Oregon, Edward C Allsworth Veteran's Home (81), Dedicated July 20, 2017
Milwaukie, Oregon, Milwaukie Bay Park, On 99E
Ontario, Oregon, Oregon Trail Rest Area on I-84 West exit 377

Pennsylvania 

 At most service areas along the Pennsylvania Turnpike, Interstate 76
US 202 at Gulph Road in King of Prussia
PA 252 at Providence Road in Media

Rhode Island 
 Dedication held on October 8, 2013.  Portsmouth Free Public Library, 2658 East Main Road, Portsmouth, Rhode Island(First Town in Rhode Island to place a Blue Star Memorial Marker.)

South Carolina 

 Brushy Creek Rd in Greer at Century Park.
 Interstate 20, throughout state.
 Milepost 0 – Eastbound Welcome Center.
 Milepost 92 – Eastbound Kershaw County Rest Area.
 Interstate 77, throughout state.
 Milepost 89 – Southbound Welcome Center.
 Interstate 85, throughout state.
 Milepost 0 – Northbound Welcome Center.
 Milepost 103 – Southbound Welcome Center.

 Interstate 95, throughout state.
 Milepost 4 – Northbound Welcome Center.
 Milepost 194 – Southbound Welcome Center.
 U.S. Route 1, throughout state.
 At York Street and Richland Avenue intersection, in Aiken.
 West end of the Gervais Street Bridge, in Columbia.
 On South Carolina State Capital grounds, in Columbia.
 Near Sesquicentennial State Park entrance, north of Columbia.
 At Hampton Park, in Camden.
 SC 151 intersection, in McBee (dedicated on April 14, 1953; rededicated on May 23, 2011); it was the sixth established blue star in the state.
 Near North Carolina state line, in Chesterfield County.

Tennessee 
 U.S. Route 45 West in Gibson County, Tennessee
 U.S. Route 25 West in Cove Lake State Park in Campbell County, Tennessee
 U.S. Route 641 within Henry County, Tennessee

 U.S. Route 31W in Sumner and Robertson County (Until 1990s)

Texas 

 Tarrant County - FM 1220 (Boat Club Road) just south of WJ Boaz Road
 U.S. 59 from Houston to Texarkana (designated 1976)
 FM 3188 from State 94 to its end at Camp Olympia in Trinity County (1983)
 U.S. 271 from Paris to Gladewater (1978)
 U.S. 287 from the Anderson-Houston county line to the Johnson-Ellis county line (1976).
 U.S. 385 from Big Bend National Park north to the Oklahoma state line north of Dalhart (1976).
 State 155 from Palestine to Linden (1975)
 U.S. 77 from the Oklahoma state line at Gainesville to Denton, then via other highways the New Mexico state line (1947 and 1953).
 SS 496 at Avondale from its junction with U.S. 287 southeasterly via Saginaw, Fort Worth and Kennedale to its junction with U.S. 287 in Mansfield (1988)

Virginia 

 Interstate 77
 Milepost 0 – Northbound Carroll County Rest Area (dedicated on May 30, 2005).
 Interstate 95
 Milepost 0 – Northbound Greensville County Rest Area.
 U.S. Route 1 in Fairfax County
 Virginia State Route 3 in Lancaster County (effective on July 1, 2011).
 U.S. Route 301 from the Maryland State Line to Business U.S. Route 301 north of Bowling Green; thence via Business U.S. Route 301 to U.S. Route 301 south of Bowling Green and via Richmond, Colonial Heights, Petersburg and Emporia to the North Carolina State Line. (General Assembly 2-24-48) 
U.S. Route 15 in Fluvanna County, on the campus of Fork Union Military Academy.
U.S. Route 17 in the City of Chesapeake, running south from Route 64 down to the North Carolina border. The highway was dedicated on May 24, 2017.

Washington 
Old Pacific Highway, Vancouver, Washington.  Oldest and newest (having been removed, restored and re-dedicated) Blue Star Memorial Highway Memorial Marker in state of Washington. Located at Covington House.
 Gateway Park, Interstate 90, Otis Orchards. Rest stop and park on the Washington side of the Idaho/Washington state line on Interstate 90. Sign located East of the buildings toward the car parking.
Green Lake Park, N. 69th Street and Aurora Avenue North on the west side of highway in Seattle. Restored Blue Star Memorial Highway Memorial Marker.
Veterans' Hospital on Beacon Hill, Seattle. New Blue Star Memorial Marker dedicated on August 5, 2016, at the garden main entrance to the hospital by the Greater Seattle and Chinook Districts of the Washington State Federation of Garden Clubs and affiliate of the National Garden Clubs, Inc.
Gee Creek Rest Area, I-5 at Ridgeview, Washington by Washington State Federation of Garden Clubs
Long Lake Garden Club in Port Orchard maintains a Blue Star marker at Retsil Veterans Home and Hospital in Port Orchard
 Hwy12 Mossyrock Dam North Recreational fishing area parking lot. What 3 words address ///absence.outwit.misled

Wyoming 
Routes in Wyoming designated as Blue Star Memorial Highways include Interstate 25 (markers at Southeast Wyoming Information Center, exit 4, and at Chugwater Rest Area, exit 54), Interstate 80 (marker at Ft. Steele Rest Area, exit 228), I-25 Business Route through Douglas (marker near downtown on Yellowstone Highway), U.S. Route 85 (marker at Mule Creek Jct. Rest Area, mile marker 196). Blue Star Memorial markers are also located in Cody, Riverton and Worland.

See also

References

External links
 
 Blue Star Memorial Program of National Garden Clubs, Inc.
 Blue Star Memorial Project of National Garden Clubs on Facebook
 Caltrans - Blue Star Memorial Highways
 Federal Highway Administration - Blue Star Memorial Highways
 Traveling Along Blue Star Highway in Michigan - Blue Star Memorial Highways
 History and Current Status of: The Blue Star Memorial Highways

Highways in the United States
Military monuments and memorials in the United States